The men's 200 metres at the 2009 World Championships in Athletics was held at the Olympic Stadium, Berlin, Germany on August 18 and August 20.

The race favourites were Tyson Gay and Usain Bolt. Gay entered the competition as the reigning world champion, championship record holder, and 200 m world leader with 19.58 seconds. Bolt, the current Olympic champion and world record holder, had a season's best of 19.59 seconds. The last time the two athletes raced was at the 2007 World Championships in Osaka, where Gay beat Bolt by a margin of 0.15 seconds. Osaka bronze medallist Wallace Spearmon was the only other athlete to run under twenty seconds that season and former Olympic champion Shawn Crawford was also competing. Up-and-coming athletes Alonso Edward, Steve Mullings and Ramil Guliyev were among the season's fastest sprinters prior to the championships.

After hurting his groin during his American record run in the 100 metres two days earlier, Gay withdrew from the race, effectively rescinding his second world title. The withdrawal of Dwain Chambers, Churandy Martina and Jaysuma Saidy Ndure also reduced the quality of the field.
There were no surprise eliminations in the heats, where Crawford, Mullings, Robert Hering, and Martial Mbandjock were the fastest qualifiers, and Mullings had the fastest time of the quarter-finals round, with all the favourite athletes progressing. On the second day of competition, German number one Hering was eliminated. Bolt and Spearmon were the two semi-final winners, while the third-fastest, 19-year-old Alonso Edward, demonstrated medal winning form.

In the final race, Usain Bolt, the clear favourite, had another world record-breaking run following his 9.58 second record in the 100 metres four days earlier. After having the fastest reaction time of the race, Bolt came out of the bend in first place and extended his lead further in the home straight, beating his previous mark of 19.30 seconds set at the Olympics by 0.11 seconds to take the gold medal and Championship record. Crawford, second fastest at the bend, was overtaken by Edward and Spearmon and eventually finished fourth. Edward vastly improved his previous best to set a South American record of 19.81, while Spearmon was third with 19.85 seconds. At 19 years, 255 days old, silver medallist Edward became the youngest ever world medallist for the men's 200 m.

Although the race between Gay and Bolt had not materialised, Bolt's world record of 19.19 seconds was a highlight of the championships. The overall quality of the event was also high: Edward had improved from 20.62 to 19.81 seconds over the course of one year. Also, with Crawford running 19.89 seconds, it was the first ever 200 m race to see four athletes run under 19.9 seconds. Bolt's winning margin of 0.62 seconds over second-placed Edward was the biggest in World Championship history. He received a $100,000 bonus for his performance, which was 0.13 seconds faster than Michael Johnson's former world record, a mark that had been regarded as one of the best records in the history of athletics.

Medalists

Records
Prior to the competition, the following records were as follows.

Qualification standards

Schedule

Results

Heats
Qualification: First 3 in each heat(Q) and the next 5 fastest(q) advance to the quarterfinals.

Quarterfinals
Qualification: First 3 in each heat(Q) and the next 4 fastest(q) advance to the semifinals.

Semifinals
First 4 of each Semifinal will be directly qualified (Q) for the Finals.

Semifinal 1

Semifinal 2

Final

References
General
200 metres results. IAAF. Retrieved on 2009-08-18.
Specific

Events at the 2009 World Championships in Athletics
200 metres at the World Athletics Championships